Iurie Anatolievici Arcan (born 15 November 1964) is a Moldovan football manager and former player, who managed Karketu Dili in 2016. He holds a UEFA Pro license.

Managerial career 
Upon moving to Indonesia, Iurie became the coach of Persija Jakarta, where he would stay until 2006. Thereafter, he took a job as manager of Persib Bandung, Persik Kediri, Persebaya Surabaya, and Persita Tangerang.

In 2014, he became the head coach for the newly-promoted Pusamania Borneo.

In 2016, he signed for Karketu Dili.

Personal life 
He converted to Islam after marrying an Indonesian woman from Bandung.

References

External links
 
 

1964 births
Living people
Footballers from Chișinău
Moldovan footballers
Moldovan football managers
Indonesian football managers
Moldovan emigrants to Indonesia
Indonesian people of Moldovan descent
Persija Jakarta managers
Moldovan expatriates in Indonesia
Indonesia Super League managers
Expatriate football managers in Indonesia
Persib Bandung managers
Converts to Islam
Indonesian Muslims
Moldovan Muslims
Soviet footballers
FC Zimbru Chișinău players
FC Dynamo Brest players
CSF Bălți players
FC Tighina players
Association football midfielders
Moldovan expatriate football managers
Moldovan expatriate sportspeople in Indonesia